Daniel Horacio Sanabria Gueyraud (born 8 February 1977) is a former Paraguayan footballer who played as a defender.

During his career, he played for Sportivo Luqueño, Club Libertad, Colo-Colo, Shonan Bellmare (Japan), Kyoto Purple Sanga (Japan), América-SP (Brazil) and Olimpia Asunción.

Sanabria played for the Paraguay national football team (6 caps, 0 goals) and was a participant at the 2002 FIFA World Cup.

Club statistics

National team statistics

References

External links

1977 births
Living people
Paraguayan footballers
Paraguayan expatriate footballers
América Futebol Clube (SP) players
Club Libertad footballers
Club Olimpia footballers
Colo-Colo footballers
Independiente Medellín footballers
Kyoto Sanga FC players
Shonan Bellmare players
Paraguayan Primera División players
Chilean Primera División players
Categoría Primera A players
J1 League players
J2 League players
Expatriate footballers in Brazil
Expatriate footballers in Chile
Expatriate footballers in Colombia
Expatriate footballers in Japan
Paraguay international footballers
2002 FIFA World Cup players
Association football defenders
2001 Copa América players